Josef Steger (24 March 1925 – 22 August 2015) was a Swiss sprinter. He competed in the men's 400 metres at the 1952 Summer Olympics.

References

1925 births
2015 deaths
Athletes (track and field) at the 1952 Summer Olympics
Swiss male sprinters
Olympic athletes of Switzerland
Place of birth missing